Alex Dimitrov (born November 30, 1984) is an American poet living in New York City.

Early life
Dimitrov is a first-generation immigrant, born in Sofia, Bulgaria, and raised in Detroit, Michigan. His parents fled a communist Bulgaria shortly before the fall of the Berlin Wall. He attended the University of Michigan in Ann Arbor, where he studied with the poet Anne Carson, and received a BA in English and Film in 2007. In 2009 he received an MFA in poetry from Sarah Lawrence College, where he studied with the poet Marie Howe.

Career
Dimitrov is the recipient of the Stanley Kunitz Prize from the American Poetry Review and a Pushcart Prize. He worked at the Academy of American Poets  for eight years, where he was the Senior Content Editor and edited the popular online series Poem-a-Day and American Poets magazine.

He has taught writing at Princeton University, Columbia University, New York University, Barnard College, Sarah Lawrence College, Rutgers University in New Brunswick, Marymount Manhattan College, and Bennington College.

In June 2012 he published American Boys, an online chapbook from Floating Wolf Quarterly. His first book of poems, Begging for It, was published by Four Way Books in March 2013. His second book of poems, Together and by Ourselves, was published by Copper Canyon Press in April 2017.

Dimitrov published his third book, Love and Other Poems, in February 2021. The title poem, "Love," was published in the American Poetry Review in their January/February 2020 issue, which featured Dimitrov on the cover.

His poems have appeared in The New Yorker, The New York Times, The Paris Review, Poetry, The Yale Review, The Kenyon Review, American Poetry Review, Slate, Tin House, Boston Review, Poetry Daily, Verse Daily, and other publications.

In February 2014, Dimitrov launched Night Call, a multimedia poetry project through which he read poems to strangers in bed and online. Some of the components of the project included a video and a poem both titled Night Call.

On November 26, 2016, with the poet Dorothea Lasky, Dimitrov founded Astro Poets. Flatiron Books published their book, Astro Poets: Your Guides to the Zodiac in October 2019.

Dimitrov published his fifth book, Love and Other Poems, in 2021 which the New York Times book review talked of a source of "impromptu shot(s) of delight".

Wilde Boys
On May 27, 2009, days after graduating from Sarah Lawrence College, Dimitrov founded Wilde Boys, a queer poetry salon that brought together emerging and established writers in New York City.

Dimitrov has also held salons focusing on the work of queer poets Joe Brainard, Tim Dlugos, Leland Hickman and Reginald Shepherd. A salon was also held in honor of Elizabeth Bishop, with special guests Richard Howard and Gabrielle Calvocoressi.

Wilde Boys ended on November 1, 2013.

Bibliography
Love and Other Poems, 2021 (Copper Canyon Press)
Astro Poets: Your Guides to the Zodiac, with Dorothea Lasky, 2019 (Flatiron Books)
Together and by Ourselves, 2017 (Copper Canyon Press)
Begging for It, 2013 (Four Way Books)
American Boys, 2012 (Floating Wolf Quarterly)

References

External links
 Begging for It
 American Boys, an echapbook by Alex Dimitrov
 The L Mag Questionnaire for Writer Types: Alex Dimitrov, The L Magazine, 15. Sept, 2011

1984 births
Living people
21st-century American male writers
21st-century American poets
21st-century LGBT people
American LGBT poets
American gay writers
American male poets
Bulgarian LGBT writers
Bulgarian emigrants to the United States
Gay poets
LGBT people from Michigan
LGBT people from New York (state)
The New Yorker people
Sarah Lawrence College alumni
University of Michigan College of Literature, Science, and the Arts alumni
Writers from Detroit
Writers from New York City